Love You may refer to:

Music

Albums
 The Beach Boys Love You, 1977

Songs
 "Love You" (song), a 2006 song by Jack Ingram
 "Love You", a song by The Free Design from ...Sing for Very Important People
 "Love You", a song by Sondre Lerche from Two Way Monologue 
 "Love You", a song by Syd Barrett from The Madcap Laughs
 "L.o.v.e U", a 2007 song by Leah Dizon

Television and film
 Love You (TV series), a 2011 Taiwanese drama
 Love You (film), a 1979 pornographic film
 Luv U, a 2012 Philippine teen comedy series

See also 
 "Love Ya" (song), a song by Unklejam
 Love Ya, an album by the Fullerton College Jazz Band
 
 I Love You (disambiguation)
 Love You More (disambiguation)